The Phobos Science Fiction Anthology Volume 1 - Empire of Dreams and Miracles (2002) is an anthology edited by Orson Scott Card and Keith Olexa.  It contains twelve stories by different writers.  All of them were winners of the 1st Annual Phobos Fiction Contest for new writer.

Story list 
The short stories in this book are:

"They Go Bump" by David Barr Kirtley
"Twenty-Two Buttons" by Rebecca Carmi
"The Hanged Man, the Lovers and the Fool" by Justin Stanchfield
"Empire of Dreams and Miracles" by James Maxey
"The Messiah" by Carl Frederick
"Eula Makes Up Her Mind" by Daniel Conover
"Carthaginian Rose" by Ken Liu
"Rippers" by Chris Leonard
"The Compromise" by Rick Sabian
"Who Lived in a Shoe" by Andrew Rey
"The Prize" by David Barr Kirtley
"Great Theme Prisons of the World" by Carl Frederick

Related works
The Phobos Science Fiction Anthology Volume 2
The Phobos Science Fiction Anthology Volume 3

External links
 

2002 anthologies
Science fiction anthology series